The events of 1962 in anime.

Accolades
Ōfuji Noburō Award: Tale of a Street Corner

Releases

Births
 March 24 - Kazuki Akane, director

See also
1962 in animation

External links 
Japanese animated works of the year, listed in the IMDb

Anime
Anime
Years in anime